Beneixama is a municipality in the comarca of Alt Vinalopó in the north of Alicante province, Valencian Community, Spain.

Gallery

See also
Beneixama photovoltaic power plant

References

External links
 

Municipalities in the Province of Alicante
Alto Vinalopó